This is a complete list in alphabetical order of cricketers who have played for Leicestershire County Cricket Club in top-class matches since 1894. Founded in 1879, the club held minor status until it was classified as a first-class team in 1894, before joining the County Championship in 1895. Leicestershire has been classified as a List A team since the beginning of limited overs cricket in 1963 and as a top-level Twenty20 team since the inauguration of the Twenty20 Cup in 2003.

The details are the player's usual name followed by the years in which he was active as a Leicestershire player and then his name is given as it would appear on modern match scorecards. Note that many players represented other top-class teams besides Leicestershire and that some played for the club in minor counties cricket before 1894. Current players are shown as active to the latest season in which they played for the club. The list excludes Second XI and other players who did not play for the club's first team; and players whose first team appearances were in minor matches only. The list has been updated to the end of the 2021 cricket season using the data published in Playfair Cricket Annual, 2022 edition.

A

B

C

D

E

F

G

H

I
 Ray Illingworth (1969–1978) : R. Illingworth
 Josh Inglis (2021) : J. P. Inglis
 Clive Inman (1961–1971) : C. C. Inman
 Anthony Ireland (2013–2014) : A. J. Ireland

J

K

L

M

N
 Jigar Naik (2006–2016) : J. K. H. Naik
 Naveen-ul-Haq (2021) : Naveen-ul-Haq
 Rowland Needham (1911) : R. Needham
 Tom New (2003–2011) : T. J. New
 Alfred Newcomb (1911) : A. E. Newcomb
 Paul Nixon (1989–2012) : P. A. Nixon
 Mick Norman (1966–1975) : M. E. J. C. Norman

O
 Iain O'Brien (2009) : I. E. O'Brien
 Niall O'Brien (2013–2016) : N. J. O'Brien
 Edwin Odell (1912) : E. F. Odell
 William Odell (1901–1914) : W. W. Odell
 James Ormond (1995–2001) : J. Ormond
 Frederick Osborn (1911–1913) : F. Osborn
 Donald Oscroft (1928) : D. S. Oscroft

P

R

S

T

U
 Geoffrey Udal (1946) : G. F. U. Udal

V
 Jack van Geloven (1956–1965) : J. van Geloven

W

See also
 List of Leicestershire cricket captains

Notes

References

Leicestershire
 
Leicestershire County Cricket Club
Cricket